Stealer: The Treasure Keeper is an upcoming South Korean television series starring Joo Won, Lee Joo-woo, Jo Han-chul, Kim Jae-won, and Choi Hwa-jung. It is scheduled to premiere on April 12, 2023 on tvN, and will air every Wednesday and Thursday at 22:30 (KST). It will also available for streaming on TVING in selected regions.

Synopsis
The series follows the story of Hwang Dae-myung (Joo Won), a government official, who is suddenly suspected of having a connection with a mysterious cultural property thief known as Skunk. He then joins an unofficial cultural asset recovery team named Karma to hunt down the thief and fight those who cannot be judged by the law.

Cast

Main
 Joo Won as Hwang Dae-myung / Skunk
 Hwang Dae-myung: a civil servant of the Special Investigation Division of the Cultural Heritage Administration.
 Skunk: a mysterious thief who always wears black mask and steals the country's cultural assets that are illegally taken by high-ranking members of society.
 Lee Joo-woo as Choi Min-woo: an elite police officer who gets assigned to the cultural heritage team of the Seoul Metropolitan Police Agency.
 Jo Han-chul as Jang Tae-in: the founder of Karma who is the former leader of the Violent Crime Section's Drug Squad.
 Kim Jae-won as Shin Chang-hoon: a former homicide detective.
 Choi Hwa-jung as Lee Chun-ja: a member of Karma who has unmatched hacking skills.

Supporting
 Lee Deok-hwa as Kim Young-soo: a person who stands at the peak of wealth with numerous cultural assets, but is blinded by endless greed.
 Min Su-hwa as Jin Ae-ri

Production
Early working title of the series was Karma: Seven Joseon Coins.

References

External links
  
 
 

Korean-language television shows
TVN (South Korean TV channel) television dramas
Television series by Studio Dragon
South Korean comedy television series
South Korean action television series
2023 South Korean television series debuts

Upcoming television series